Washington School is a school listed on the National Register of Historic Places in Nevada and is located at 1901 N. White Street in the city of North Las Vegas. The school was open and operated by the Clark County School District until early 2016 when it closed due to budget cuts.

History 
The building was added to the National Register of Historic Places in 1992.

It is a one-story Moderne building holding two classrooms. It is built upon a concrete foundation, with concrete block walls divided into bays by Moderne style pilasters. It has a flat roof behind a parapet.

References 

National Register of Historic Places in Clark County, Nevada
Defunct schools in Nevada
Clark County School District
Buildings and structures in North Las Vegas, Nevada
Schools in Clark County, Nevada
Streamline Moderne architecture in the United States
Educational institutions established in 1932
School buildings completed in 1932
School buildings on the National Register of Historic Places in Nevada
1932 establishments in Nevada